Gmina Leśna is an urban-rural gmina (administrative district) in Lubań County, Lower Silesian Voivodeship, in south-western Poland.

Neighbouring gminas
Gmina Leśna is bordered by the town of Świeradów-Zdrój and the gminas of Gryfów Śląski, Lubań, Mirsk, Olszyna and Platerówka. It also borders the Czech Republic.

Villages
Apart from the town of Leśna, the gmina contains the villages of Bartoszówka, Grabiszyce Dolne, Grabiszyce Górne, Grabiszyce Średnie, Kościelniki Górne, Kościelniki Górne-Janówka, Kościelniki Średnie, Miłoszów, Pobiedna, Smolnik, Smolnik-Jurków, Stankowice, Stankowice-Sucha, Świecie, Szyszkowa, Wolimierz, Zacisze, Złotniki Lubańskie and Złoty Potok.

Twin towns – sister cities

Gmina Leśna is twinned with:

 Dolní Řasnice, Czech Republic (1999)
 Horní Řasnice, Czech Republic (1999)
 Jindřichovice pod Smrkem, Czech Republic (1999)
 Nové Město pod Smrkem, Czech Republic (1999)
 Leutersdorf, Germany (2000)
 Wyrzysk, Poland (2003)
 Schönau-Berzdorf, Germany (2013)

References

Lesna
Lubań County